Cooper Hall, known also as Cooper Memorial College Building, located on N. Broadway Ave. in Sterling, Kansas, was built in 1887.  It was listed on the National Register of Historic Places in 1974.

It was the main building of Cooper Memorial College. It is a three-story irregularly shaped building on an approximately  plan.

References

University and college buildings on the National Register of Historic Places in Kansas
Buildings and structures completed in 1887
Rice County, Kansas